Tackaberry Airport  was a privately owned, public use airport located two nautical miles (4 km) west of the central business district of Avoca, a community in Kenockee Township, St. Clair County, Michigan, United States.

The airport is now closed and no longer listed in the FAA or Michigan airport directories.

Facilities and aircraft 
Tackaberry Airport covers an area of 15 acres (6 ha) at an elevation of 764 feet (233 m) above mean sea level. It has one runway designated 18/36 with a turf surface measuring 2,244 by 65 feet (684 x 20 m). For the 12-month period ending December 31, 2007, the airport had 360 general aviation aircraft operations, an average of 30 per month.

References

External links 
 Aerial image as of April 2000 from USGS The National Map

Airports in Michigan
Defunct airports in Michigan
Transportation in St. Clair County, Michigan